Christine Ko (born August 3, 1988) is a Taiwanese-American actress, known for her roles as Emma on the CBS sitcom The Great Indoors, Mandy on Upload and Emma on Dave.  Before her success in America, she had a brief career in Taiwan in the early 2010s.

Biography
Ko was born in Chicago and grew up in both Taiwan and Atlanta. She is the daughter of legendary Taiwanese entertainer Frankie Kao. Ko has discussed the issue of limited roles for Asian American actors in the United States. Her role on The Great Indoors was originally written for a blond woman, but Ko's agent was able to get her an audition. After her audition, the producers changed their original idea of Emma's appearance. Ko said, "I think that's true diversity. You're just like everybody else. You just look Asian... It's the norm and how we all live. We just haven't seen it in Hollywood yet."

Ko joined the cast of the television series Hawaii Five-0 part way into its eighth season. She also guest-starred in the HBO comedy series Ballers. She stars on the FXX series Dave alongside Dave Burd.

In 2021, she starred alongside Canadian singer Justin Bieber in the music video of his song "Hold On".

Filmography

Film

Television

Personal life 
Ko is engaged to Parks & Recreation writer and producer Alan Yang.

References

External links

 
Christineko.com

Living people
1988 births
American actresses of Taiwanese descent
Georgia State University alumni
Actresses from Chicago
American television actresses
21st-century American actresses
American actresses of Chinese descent
American film actors of Vietnamese descent
American expatriates in Taiwan